Lone Wolf is the sixteenth and penultimate novel in the CHERUB series by Robert Muchamore, and the fourth book of the Aramov series. It was released on 1 August 2014.

Plot
The book is set in and around North London. The prologue is based around Fay Hoyt and her aunt Kirsten, and is set in December 2012. Fay's mother Melanie was killed by a drug dealer, so she is living with her aunt in St John's Wood, London. They rob the drug dealer that killed Melanie, who is called Hagar, and attempt to sell the stock in Manchester, but Kirsten is caught by police. Fay temporarily goes on the run, but is caught by police after she goes back to London. Kirsten is sent to prison, where she is killed by representatives of Hagar. Fay is sent to a Secure Training Compound.

Back in 2014, CHERUB agents Fu Ning and Ryan Sharma are given a mission - to take down the drug gang led by Hagar. Their mission controller is former CHERUB agent, and lead character in the first 12 books, James Adams. Ryan is given the job of befriending people close to the gang, and attempting to make himself known in order to pick up information for the intelligence services. Ning is given the job of befriending Fay, who is due to be released in a week's time from the STC. The girls immediately grow close, but Ryan struggles to make friends until a scheme devised by James makes him popular.

Ning and Fay begin an assault on Hagar's supplies of drugs, first stealing cocaine from his brother, and then taking cannabis from his grow house. They sell the cocaine to one of Hagar's rivals, Eli, and Fay uses an informant called Warren to help them, who later becomes Fay's boyfriend. Meanwhile, Ryan completes various jobs for Hagar's organisation, and passes a 'test' devised for him by Craig Willow, one of Hagar's lieutenants, which involved him having drugs stolen from him, and working off his debt in a company owned by Hagar for money-laundering purposes. As he becomes more respected in the organisation, he is sent out to do other jobs, including threatening a man who owes Hagar money.

Fay sets Hagar and Eli off against one another and they attempt to destroy each other's businesses. The gang war looks set to escalate, until Hagar and Eli make a deal, and conspire to track down Fay. Meanwhile, Ryan begins to uncover information regarding the supply of drugs in North London, and stumbles across some information regarding a local charity owner, Barry Crewdson, and his family. Ryan discovers that they are the real drug barons, and Hagar and Eli are just street operators. As the hunt for Ning and Fay intensifies, Eli's lieutenant Shawn comes closest to catching Fay, but she runs off. However, they do catch Ning, and she has her arm broken by another of Eli's lieutenants.

The book ends a few weeks later, with Ning, Ryan, James and James' girlfriend Kerry Chang (also a major character in the first 12 books) sitting down to watch a preview of a BBC Panorama programme that is due to go out soon about the Crewdsons and the drug scandal surrounding them. The epilogue is also about Fay, as she sneaks into a luxury health resort where Hagar is staying, and kills him on the massage table, before heading back outside to join Warren, and the two of them ride away on a bike together.

CHERUB novels
2014 British novels
Hodder & Stoughton books
Novels set in London